Kozağaç (literally "walnut tree" in Turkish) may refer to the following places in Turkey:

 Kozağaç, Beypazarı, a village in the district of Beypazarı, Ankara Province
 Kozağaç, Kahta, a village in the district of Kahta, Adıyaman Province
 Kozağaç, Serik, a village in the district of Serik, Antalya Province

See also
 Kozağacı (disambiguation), different form of the same word